Albanian mafia or Albanian organized crime are the general terms used for criminal organizations based in Albania or composed of ethnic Albanians. Albanian organized crime is active in Europe, North America, South America, and various other parts of the world including the Middle East and Asia. The Albanian Mafia participates in a diverse range of criminal enterprises including trafficking in drugs, arms, and humans. They are said to control a large part of the billion dollar wholesale cocaine market in Europe and appear to be the primary distributors of cocaine in various European drug hubs including London. Albanian organized crime is characterized by diversified criminal enterprises which, in their complexity, demonstrate a very high criminal capacity. In Albania, there are over 15 mafia families that control organized crime.

The Albanian mafia has monopolized various international affiliations from as far east as Israel, to as far west as South America. These reports primarily indicate a strong connection between politicians and various Albanian mafia families. According to the Research Institute for European and American Studies (RIEAS), Albanian mafia groups are hybrid organizations (i.e. composed of people from various sectors of society), and are often involved in both criminal and political activities.

The Albanian Mafia constitutes one of the highest crime generating elements in the world, combining the "traditional" characteristics of organized crime – its rigid internal discipline, its clan structure, its "endogamic closure" (marrying within the organization) which increases the organization's impermeability, and its internal cohesion – with modern and innovative characteristics, such as trans-nationality, . The massive logistic capacity and the diverse nature of Albanian organized crime has facilitated its establishment outside the mother country and its integration with local criminal elements.

In the United States, the term "Albanian Mafia" may include or refer specifically to various Albanian-American organized crime groups, such as the Rudaj Organization and the Albanian Boys, both based in New York City, Albanian-American crime groups vary in the extent of their connections to Albanian mafia groups in Albania or Europe, ranging from loosely connected to or mostly independent of Albanian mafias in Europe to being essentially American extensions of European Albanian mafia groups.

Structure and composition

Clan hierarchy
The typical structure of the Albanian mafia is hierarchical. A family clan is referred to as a "fis" or a "fare." Families contain an executive committee known as a "Bajrak" and select a high-ranking member for each unit. A unit is led by a "Krye" or "Boss" who selects "Kryetar" or "Underbosses" to serve under them. The Kryetar will then choose a "Mik" or "Friend" who acts as a liaison to members and is responsible for coordinating unit activities.

Membership
Deeply reliant on loyalty, honour, and family—with blood relations and marriage being very important—most of the Albanian networks appear to be "old-fashioned". Albanian mafia families or clans are usually made up of groups that have thousands of members all over the world, constituting an extended family, residing all along the Balkan route from Eastern Turkey, to Western Europe, and North America.

According to Ioannis Michaletos, the family structure is characterised by a strong inner discipline, which is achieved by means of punitive action for every deviation from internal rules. Punishment ensures fear, and fear guarantees unconditional loyalty to the family. Provisions within the family structure allow official laws to be considered secondary, unimportant, and non-binding. Since mafia families are based on blood relations, the number of clan members are limited, and bonds between them tend to be very strong. As a result, infiltrating into the mafia is almost impossible. Members of other ethnic groups can be accepted only to execute one time or secondary jobs. The Albanian mafia families are organised in 4–6 or more levels; such a structure enables them to preserve the organisational action capability even in case some of its members or groups are captured.

Clans by region in Albania
The Albanian mafia has clans throughout the world. In Albania, there are clans that operate in certain towns or cities. Each region is controlled by different mafia families that oversee international operations. In Shijak, the Xhakja clan is powerful and has an extensive history of criminal family members. Other prominent Albanian mafia families operating in and around Albania include; The Bregus or "Bregu" crime family, run by Armir Bregu, who is serving time in United Kingdom, the Osmani family, Kerkiku, Caushi, Shehu, Kakami and Hasani and the "Banda e Lushnjës" whose boss "Aldo Bare" has since been arrested and prosecuted.

Rituals and codes of conduct

Besa
The Albanian mafia uses the term besa, meaning "trust", as a name for their "code of honour". During the recruitment process a member inducted into the Albanian mafia is required to take an oath. The oath is then considered sacred because it is defined as a Besë. Besa is extremely important in Albanian culture, and is considered a verbal contract of trust. Especially in North Albania, when somebody gives someone their Besë, they have given someone their life and are going to protect someone with their life.

Involvement in government
Organized crime became widespread in Albania during the early 90s, after the fall of communism. Blackmail, intimidation and racketeering became commonplace. A 2003 report by the Office of the Special Coordinator of the Stability Pact for South-Eastern Europe remarks that "Albania is the paradise for the illegal trade. Neither state nor police present problem for the drug chiefs: you can buy politicians and it is not rare when a leader of the criminal gang works in some state institution". Albanian mafia groups are often involved in both criminal and political activities in order to influence political developments. Albanian Prime Ministers Sali Berisha and Edi Rama have both been linked to organized crime groups in Albania.

International activity
According to the US State Department, "Albania is the mainstay of organised crime worldwide and the main points of drug trafficking, weapons and immigrants in counterfeit goods". In addition, "the cartels 'national' are distinguished by the absence of vertical hierarchy, and controlled by family groups. Four major clans control 20 families that also govern human trafficking, prostitution, blackmail, car robberies and money laundering," writes Sputnik.

Up until the 1990s, Kosovo Albanians served as couriers for Turkish gangs. However, a rapid increase in Albanian migration to Western Europe created widespread organised crime networks, leading to an Albanian takeover of the entire illegal trade coming to Western Europe via the Balkans. Albania experienced a rise in gangs and the drug trade following the economic collapse during the 1990s, caused by the pyramid schemes in 1997. The economy's reliance on drug trade and smuggling has led the country to be declared as Europe's only narco-state.

The Turkish and Italian Mafia organisations are the main partners of the Albanian mafia in drug trafficking. The latter, according to Sputnik, maintain links with officials, police, customs, intelligence and even military in their countries.

China
The Albanian mafia has extended its activities into China. This after Chinese authorities have uncovered Albanian mafia activity including drug trafficking and prostitution networks. Reports state that the mafia is involved in drug transporting to various Chinese cities. Further, after smuggling the drugs, they are involved in human smuggling of Chinese nationals to Europe.

Israel
The Israeli government has confirmed its concern that the Albanian mafia has spread its influence in the country's banking system. The Israeli intelligence agency has called for a close cooperation between Israel and Albania to combat money laundering. Justice Ministry General Manager, Dr. Guy Rotkopf noted; "this is an important step in international cooperation between our countries to combat money laundering with the force of law and to deepen relations between Israel and other countries."

Australia
A lengthy News Corp Australia investigation has found that an Albanian Mafia group—led by some of Australia's most wanted men—have established "entrenched infiltration" of almost every level of Australian society and according to Australian Federal Police:

European Organised Crime, primarily the Albanian Mafia is now one of the largest organised crime threats to Australia, so entrenched and disciplined and influential in local communities it has made this a serious challenge to crack.

The mostly Australian run group, led by former Kings Cross identity Vaso Ulić, a Montenegrin immigrant who left Australia in 2005 never to return, was now networked to become one of the biggest transnational crime groups in the world importing six tonnes a year into Australia alone but many more to and from other destinations from South Africa to Europe, China, Nigeria and the Americas with law enforcers from notably the United Kingdom, United States and Italy involved in their pursuance.

Vaso Ulic is a 55-year-old ethnic Montenegrin who migrated to Australia in 1979 and within a few years was working as a small-time foot soldier running drugs and cash along the infamous Golden Mile of Kings Cross but who is now seen as a kingpin of an organisation so big, very few drug consignments enter Australia without his knowledge or permission.

It has been confirmed the prosecutions office in Montenegro, where Ulic is residing, has an extensive file on Ulic and other figures in the country as part of an international arrest warrant to break the cartel up.

An internal police assessment relayed to the Federal Government claims their criminality now extends worldwide with direct Australian-Albanian Organised Crime links to notorious Mexican and Colombian clans and cartels and Asian triads including the 14K group, South African crime lords and Italian and Dutch criminal groups, with predominantly Melbourne, Sydney, Queensland, South Australia & Tasmania using motorcycle gangs as part of the national distribution & enforcement network for the Albanians.

Europe

Belgium
In 1989, Belgian Prime Minister Paul Vanden Boeynants was kidnapped in a plot organised by Basri Bajrami. Bajrami was acknowledged by authorities as a member of the Albanian mafia at that time. The Albanian mafia has deep roots in Belgium, which was recently a topic of a special programme on Belgian RTBF Channel One. Reporters tried to investigate the roots of Albanian organised crime but have complained that it is too hard to penetrate the structure and organisation of the Albanian mafia, but they agreed that the Albanian mafia acts on the model of the Italian one, whose crime is part of the "activities of entire families" and which has a clearly defined
hierarchy. The Albanian mafia in Brussels has monopoly over activities such as "narcotics and arms deals", according to Belgian sources.

France
The Albanian mafia in France is described as having a monopoly over many criminal transactions including arms and drug trafficking. The Albanian mafia has a strong foothold in France, which is a key strategy as other primary transactions are overseen in neighbouring countries by different mafia families and clans. French media has stated that "In many cities of France, there is a network of the Albanian mafia who are involved in narcotics trafficking and prostitution. It is a highly organized network and is very difficult to find their roots and penetrate it".

Greece
A 2013 report by the Greek security services and Greek police on Albanian organized crime in the Hellenic Republic concluded that the Albanian mafia controls approximately fifty percent of human trafficking, eighty percent of the retail distribution of heroin, and ninety percent of the importation of illegal small arms in Greece, and that about fifty percent of armed robberies of homes and businesses in the country were committed by Albanians. The analysis also drew links between Albanian nationalism and organized crime.

Italy
The geographic vicinity, the accessibility to the E.U. through Italy, and the ties with the Calabrian and Apulia criminality have all contributed to the expansion of the Albanian criminality on the Italian scenario.

Further factors relative to the economy have rendered the Albanian criminality even more competitive. In fact, some organisations which reached Italy in the early 1990s, infiltrated the Lombardy narco-traffic network run by the 'ndrangheta. Albanian mafia leaders have reached stable agreements with the Italian criminal organisations, also with the mafia, so have gained legitimacy in many illegal circuits, diversifying their activities to avoid reasons of conflict with similar host structures. So, Albanian drug trafficking has emerged in Apulia, Sicily, Calabria and Campania.

Trading route
The Albanian mafia reportedly uses specific trading routes to transport narcotics and illegal immigrants to Italy. Their southern route is via Montenegro and Albania. Access is then gained to Italy by boat.

Sicilian Mafia – Cosa Nostra
Since the beginning of the 1990s, Italy has been clamping down hard on the Sicilian Mafia. According to the deputy director of the Center for Strategic and International Studies (CSIS), at the end of the 1990s the mafia sought to survive this crackdown by forming a "symbiotic" relationship with the Albanian crime families known as fares, who provided the struggling Sicilians a hand in a number of services in their operations across Italy. Today, both Sicilian mafia groups and the 'Ndrangheta are believed to have franchised out prostitution, gambling, and drug dealing in territories along the Adriatic coast to the Albanians. One CSIS report even claimed that this partnership had proved so successful that the Sicilian mafia established a 'headquarters' in Vlorë, a coastal town in southern Albania at the close of the 1990s.

Albanian clandestine immigrants started arriving at Italian ports in 1991. By 1997, the immigration had come under the control of the Albanian and Italian criminal groups, tightening relationships between them. The Albanian criminal gangs have recently created in Sicily relations of interest with the Cosa Nostra.

Sacra Corona Unita 
The Albanian mafia seems to have established good working relationships with the Italian Mafia, On 27 July 1999 police in Durrës (Albania), with Italian assistance arrested one of the godfathers of the "Sacra Corona Unita", Puglia's Italian mafia. This Albanian link seems to confirm that the Sacra Corona Unita and the Albanian mafia are "partners" in Puglia/Italy and delegate several criminal activities. Thus, in many areas of Italy, the market for cannabis, prostitution, and smuggling is run mainly by Albanians.

Camorra
Roberto Saviano, the Italian writer, an expert on the Napolitan Camorra in particular and the Italian mafia in general, spoke of the Albanian mafia as a "no longer foreign mafia" to Italy and stressed that the Albanians and Italians have a "brotherly" relationship between each other. Saviano notes that the Camorra from Naples cannot understand the Russian mafia clans, which aren't based on family ties, and feels greater affinity with the Albanian crime families.

'Ndrangheta
In an Albanian television station Top Channel TV, Saviano went on to say that the Albanian and Italian factions are "one of the same", and that they don't consider each other as foreigners. Links to Calabria's mafia, the Ndrangheta, exist in Northern Italy. Several key figures of the Albanian mafia seem to reside frequently in the Calabrian towns of Africo, Platì, and Bovalino (Italy), fiefs of the Ndrangheta.

According to the German Federal Intelligence Service, the Bundesnachrichtendienst (BND), in a leaked report to a Berlin newspaper, states that the 'Ndrangheta "act in close co-operation with Albanian mafia families in moving weapons and narcotics across Europe's porous borders".

Società foggiana
According to numerous reports, the brutal criminal organisation from Foggia, known as the Società foggiana has several contacts with the Albanian mafia, particularly regarding to the drug trafficking business, also creating drugs routes from Albania to Foggia. In 2020 the Italian police noticed that there is a scheme in the city of San Severo, in the Province of Foggia, between the Albanians and the Società foggiana.

Netherlands
According to Dutch police, Albanian crime groups lead the importation of cocaine from South America, the transshipment via the port of Rotterdam, and the further distribution to other European countries from Amsterdam. In addition to cocaine trafficking, the Albanian mafia in the Netherlands is also engaged in human trafficking and property fraud. In June 2019, the government of the Netherlands requested the suspension of visa-free travel for Albanians, citing claims the Albanian mafia is free to move across the Europe because of the visa-free European Union regime.

Scandinavia
"The ethnic Albanian mafia is very powerful and extremely violent," said Kim Kliver, chief investigator for organised crime with the Danish National Police. Law enforcement authorities estimate that different Albanian mafia families may smuggle as much as 440 pounds of heroin a year into Scandinavia at any given time.

Spain
According to Spanish Authorities, the Albanian mafia is composed of powerful organised factions. In a report by Spanish Authorities, the factions have infiltrated banks and industrial estates. They are very active in Madrid and Costa Del Sol.

Switzerland
Geneva Deputy Public Prosecutors state that the Albanian mafia is one of the most powerful ones among eight identified mafias in the world. The other mafia organizations around the world are the Russian mafia, Chinese (Triad), Japanese (Yakuza), Italian Mafia, Colombian (drug cartels) organizations, and Mexican (drug cartels) organizations. The Albanian mafia controls the entire network of heroin trafficking in Geneva, Switzerland. The Geneva deputy public prosecutors also added that the Albanian mafia "is laundering a part of income in Geneva economy, restaurants, bars, real estate and cabarets".

United Kingdom
Albanian mafia gangs are believed to be largely behind sex trafficking, migrant smuggling, as well as working with Turkish gangs in Southend-on-Sea, who control the heroin trade in the United Kingdom. Although specifically known for sex trafficking, particularly in the UK, it's been said that the Albanian mafia's primary illegal business in Europe and the UK in terms of profit margins is now cocaine trafficking.

Vice squad officers estimate that "Albanians now control more than 75 per cent of the country's brothels and their operations in London's Soho alone are worth more than £15 million a year." They are said to be present in every big city in Britain as well as in many smaller ones including Telford and Lancaster, after having fought off rival criminals in turf wars. Associate groups within the organizations will also hide their criminal activities within restaurants, bars, and clubs in an attempt to remain undercover.

Albanian gangsters were also involved in the largest cash robbery in British crime history, the £53 million Securitas heist in 2006.

According to the Scottish Crime and Drug Enforcement Agency (SCDEA), Albanian mafia groups have muscled in on the drug and vice trades within the Scottish underworld. The SCDEA notes that Albanian mafia groups have established a foothold in arms and drugs trafficking in Scotland.

Albanian mafia in the UK is heavily involved in prostitution and together with Turkish mafia control more than 70% of prostitution market in London.

In the last few years Albanian mafia was involved more in drug trafficking (Hellbanianz) than in prostitution and they sold more than 500,000 kilograms of drugs in London alone. Due to their expansive and deep involvement in drug trading, the Albanian Mafia has climbed its way to the top of a five billion euro market (US$5.3 billion). The group uses its connections in South America to ship high quality, low price cocaine, heroin, and marijuana to European counties, specifically the United Kingdom. An article in The Guardian noted that "the latest UK criminal threat assessment says that the Albanians are unusually skilled at developing relationships and 'forging links with other OCGs [organized crime gangs].'" The cooperation between Albanians and other existing groups has aided in the rapid growth of drug trafficking throughout the United Kingdom's residential regions.

North America

Canada
The Albanian mafia is firmly established in Canadian cities, such as Toronto, Montreal and Vancouver. Albanians are involved in various white collar activities, such as real estate and health care fraud. Furthermore, they are engaged in cross-border activity between the United States and Canada, which includes drug smuggling and money laundering.

A Canadian Security Intelligence Service report noted that although organised crime in Canada has shifted to more multi-ethnic and loosely based structures, the term "mafia" is used only to identify the "big three," which have hierarchical structures that are ethnically, racially, and culturally homogeneous: the Italian, Albanian, and Russian mafias.

United States
The Albanian mafia in the United States has been thought to greatly increase their dominant power and is one of the most violent criminal organisations in operation, particularly with their strong connections in the European Union.

In the United States, Albanian gangs started to be active in the mid-80s, mostly participating in low-level crimes, such as burglaries and robberies. Later, they would become affiliated with Cosa Nostra crime families before eventually growing strong enough to operate their own organisations AM0B or A•M013 Detroit Albanian Mafia last name Camaj.

During investigations conducted by FBI experts in the city of New York and surrounding areas against the Albanian mafia, it was noted that the Albanian mafia was too widespread and too secretive to penetrate. Furthermore, although there have been a number of operations performed by the FBI to destroy organised crime such as Italian and Russian factions, the Albanian mafia continues to be widespread in New York in a relatively high number.

In 2011, a New York-based Albanian-American mob was successfully convicted by the New York US attorney's office. It was coordinated by the International Narcotics Strike Force (made up of the DEA, NYPD, ICE/HSI, New York State Police, IRS, and U.S. Marshals). The American-Albanian mob was described as having "hundreds of associated members, workers, and customers spanning three continents" and with trafficking drugs from Detroit, Canada, Mexico, the Netherlands, Colombia, Peru, and Venezuela. They were also in close cooperation with other mafia families based in the European Union.

According to Jerry Capeci, the national foremost expert on the American Mafia "Albanian gangsters are the latest ethnic criminals to be presented by authorities as competition for the old and dying Mafiosi. Like Irish, Cuban, Russian, Chinese and Greek hoodlums before them, the Albanians are not serious competition for what the F.B.I. calls traditional organised crime, the Italian mob. There are nowhere near enough of them."

The FBI says that "they do not yet demonstrate the established criminal sophistication of traditional Eurasian or La Cosa Nostra (LCN) organisations. There is no single Balkan 'Mafia' structured hierarchically like the traditional LCN. Rather, Balkan organised crime groups in this country translated their clan-like structure to the United States. They are not clearly defined or organised and are instead grouped around a central leader or leaders."

In early 2012, the White House sanctioned suspected Albanian mafia king pin Naser Kelmendi for drug trafficking. US President Barack Obama notified Congress saying he had sanctioned Kelmendi under the Kingpin Act, implemented by the US Department of Treasury's Office of Foreign Assets Control (OFAC). Kalmendi is suspected of leading one of the strongest ethnic Albanian criminal families in the Balkans, according to the Treasury Department. He has long been suspected of running a large organisation that traffics heroin, cocaine and acetic anhydride, a raw material used in the production of heroin, to Europe through the Balkans.

Rudaj Organization (New York)

One of the most famous Albanian criminal organization was the Rudaj Organization. In October 2004, the Federal Bureau of Investigation (FBI) arrested 22 men who worked for it. Among them was Alex Rudaj, the leader of the organisation, whose arrest effectively ended the workings of the Rudaj. The arrests were made shortly after the men entered the territory of the Lucchese crime family in Astoria, Queens, New York, and supposedly beat up two members of the Lucchese family.

The name Rudaj comes from the head of the organisation. According to The New York Times published in January 2006, "Beginning in the 1990s, the Corporation, led by a man named Alex Rudaj, established ties with established organised crime figures including members of the Gambino crime family, the authorities say. Then, through negotiations or in armed showdowns, the Albanians struck out on their own, daring to battle the Lucchese and Gambino families for territory in Queens, the Bronx and Westchester County, prosecutors say."

In 2001, Albanian mobsters stormed a Gambino hangout in Astoria, Queens, sending a brazen message to the family. The club, called Soccer Fever, was now theirs. The seven men who invaded the dimly lit basement club tore the joint apart, shot off handguns and beat the club manager bloody, prosecutors say. It was a bold move, and, prior to August 2001 unthinkable.

Gambino leader Arnold Squitieri had had enough and wanted a talk with these rogue mobsters. The "sit down" took place at a gas station in a rest area near the New Jersey turnpike. Squitieri did not come alone; twenty armed Gambino mobsters accompanied their boss. Alex Rudaj on the other hand had only managed to bring six members of his crew. According to undercover FBI agent Joaquin Garcia, who infiltrated the Gambino crime family during this period, Squitieri told Rudaj that the fun was over and that they should stop expanding their operations. The Albanians and Gambinos then pulled out their weapons. Knowing they were outnumbered, the Albanians threatened to blow up the gas station with all of them in it. This ended the discussion, and both groups pulled back.

By 2006, all the main players involved in this "sit down" were in prison. Rudaj and his Sixth Family had been picked off the street in October 2004 and charged with a variety of racketeering and gambling charges. After a trial, Rudaj and his main lieutenants were all found guilty. In 2006, Rudaj, at that time 38 years old, was sentenced to 27 years in prison. His rival Arnold Squitieri was convicted in an unrelated racketeering case and was sent to prison for seven years.

"What we have here might be considered a sixth crime family", after the five mafia organizations—Bonanno, Colombo, Gambino, Genovese, and Lucchese—said Fred Snelling, head of the FBI's criminal division in New York.

Potential
Speaking anonymously for Philadelphia's City Paper, a member of the "Kielbasa Posse", an ethnic Polish mob group, declared in 2002 that Poles are willing to do business with "just about anybody. Dominicans. Blacks. Italians. Asian street gangs. Russians. But they won't go near the Albanian mob. The Albanians are too violent and too unpredictable."

The Polish mob has told its associates that the Albanians are like the early Sicilian mafia—clannish, secretive, hypersensitive to any kind of insult, and too quick to use violence for the sake of vengeance.

Honduras
Reliable information from Honduras indicates formidable Albanian mafia activity. According to WikiLeaks reports, Albanian mafia groups are affiliated with various South American politicians, and have set in motion to move their hidden assets in various banks. The WikiLeaks report goes on to state that Albanian mafia groups are preying heavily in Central America, where all roads lead to Colombian cocaine. Albanian mafia groups are laundering money through banks in Honduras and investing a large amount in construction projects to further gain influence in South America.

Prominent Albanian mafiosi
 Zef Mustafa was an associate to the Gambino family based in New York. He pleaded guilty to money laundering.
 Xhevdet Lika was an American-Albanian kingpin who was notorious within the New York City criminal underworld. In the book Contract Killer by Hoffman and Headley, it was noted that even though his is not a name of household familiarity in the American upperworld like "Al Capone" or "John Gotti", Xhevedet "Joe" Lika was known in the international underworld. The book also noted; "He didn't like Italians and they left him alone because he was so violent. Like Japanese kamikazes, his heavy hitter mobsters would go after John Gotti, Paul Castellano, or even President Reagan, if Lika gave the word. There was no way to stop people like that, and Mafiosi knew it".
 Joseph Ardizzone was ethnic Albanian from Sicily and the founder and first boss of the Los Angeles crime family
 Princ Dobroshi is one of the biggest heroin kingpins in Europe.
 Alfred Shkurti (also known as Aldo Bare) is the boss of one of the most notorious criminal syndicates in Albania known as the "Banda e Lushnjës" ("the Lushnja Gang"). According to Albanian authorities, Banda e Lushnjës is one of the most notorious organized crime group based in Lushnja, Albania which has international operations. According to Albanian authorities, Banda e Lushnjës, under Aldo Bare "Leads one of the most important international drug trafficking rings"'
 Ismail Lika was, according to the FBI, an Albanian mobster active in New York City in the 1980s. Dubbed the "King of the New York drug underworld", Ismail Lika issued a contract on Rudy Giuliani's prosecutors in 1985. Caught with at least $125 million in heroin, Lika issued a $400,000 contract on the prosecutor Alan Cohen and the detective Jack Delemore, both placed under protective custody.
 Lul Berisha is the leader of a notorious clan based in Durrës, Albania. Known as "Banda e Lul Berishes", the clan, by its complex structure is engaged in moving drug and arms trafficking and other criminal activities throughout Europe. According to German and Albanian authorities, the clans international drug and arms trafficking spans to Turkey, Bulgaria, Italy, and Germany.
 Armand Krasniqi is a former Albanian mafia kingpin based in Zagreb, Croatia. According to the Croatian newspaper Jutarnji List, Krasniqi led a powerful mafia clan with international operations.
 Naser Xhelili was coined by Swedish authorities as the "Albanian Connection" in Sweden. The Xhelili clan operations include drugs and arms trafficking in and around Sweden.
 Osmani Brothers are, according to the German Federal Intelligence Service (Bundesnachrichtendienst), the "most important figures of organized crime in Hamburg and other cities in Germany".
 Myfit Dika is a former drug kingpin of the "Balkan Criminal Enterprises"; an international criminal organization which spanned from Canada, the United States, to Europe.
 Kapllan Murat is Belgium's most notorious mobster. He was one of the masterminds behind the kidnapping of former Belgian Prime Minister Paul Vanden Boeynants in 1989. Three days later, the criminals published a note in the leading Brussels newspaper Le Soir, demanding 30 million Belgian francs in ransom. Boeynants was released physically unharmed a month later, on 13 February, when an undisclosed ransom was paid to the perpetrators.
 Gjavit Thaqi is the leader of the "Thaci Organisation" which is a New York City-based organised crime syndicate. The Thaci Organisation controls drug distribution cells in all five boroughs of New York City and Albany. According to the FBI, the Thaci Organisation has international operations in Canada, the United States, and Europe.
 John Alite, also known as "Johnny Alletto" (born 30 September 1962), is a New York City based Albanian mobster. A former associate of the Gambino crime family, he was an enforcer for John A. Gotti in the 1980s and 1990s. Following extradition from Brazil in 2006, he was convicted in Tampa, Florida of several counts of murder conspiracy, racketeering and other charges stemming from allegedly heading a unit of the Gambino organisation in Florida and was sentenced in 2011 to 10 years in prison (of which he had already served six). He was a prosecution witness against former associates, including Gotti and Charles Carneglia, in wide-ranging racketeering trials. While a part of the Gambino organisation, because his family is Albanian, not Italian, Alite could not become a made member of the organisation.
 Naser Kelmendi is the leader of a Balkan Criminal Empire, as coined by Bosnian authorities. According to a report presented by Interpol, the Kelmendi crime family heads one of the most powerful organised criminal organisations not only in BiH, but in the whole region. The Kelmendi organisation has been involved in drug and cigarette trafficking, money laundering and loan sharking. According to the Interpol report, the organisation's influence reaches to Montenegro, Kosovo, North Macedonia, Croatia, Serbia, Germany and the United States. Furthermore, according to the CIA Kalmendi leads one of the strongest ethnic Albanian criminal families in the Balkans. Kelmendi's organization is believed to traffic in cocaine and heroin, as well as acetic anhydride, a basic ingredient in heroin production. Naser Kelmendi was apprehended on 5 May 2013.
 Elvis Kelmendi has made headlines as a violent drug kingpin and was apprehended in May 2013.
 Luan Plakici, the "Vice King" of the Albanian mafia in the UK who was jailed for 10 years (later increased to 23 years) for trafficking women after promising them good jobs.
 Erkman Rock, the "Kingpin" of New York and New Jersey's Albanian mafia was featured on Americas Most Wanted and apprehended in May 2012.
 Baki Sadiki is the head of the Albanian mafia in Slovakia
 Plaurent Dervishaj is a prominent Albanian mafia member that is being pursued by the FBI in the United States. He is presently listed on the FBI "Most Wanted" list which is known to provide financial rewards to individuals who assist in their capture. Dervishaj was located and arrested in Dubai but released upon awaiting extradition to Albania.
 Dukagjin Nikollaj is an Albanian mafia member who is listed on the FBI Most wanted list for various crimes.

In popular culture 
 The Albanian Mob appear in the 2008 video game Grand Theft Auto IV and its expansion packs, The Lost and Damned and The Ballad of Gay Tony, all three set within the fictional Liberty City (based on New York). They mainly operate in the Hove Beach district of Broker (Brooklyn), and Little Bay in Bohan (Bronx), and engage in loan sharking, extortion, stick ups, and credit card fraud. They serve as hired guns for more powerful criminal syndicates in the city, mainly the Ancelotti crime family. The Albanians serve as the main antagonists during the early stages of GTA IV, until the player scares them away by killing their leader, Dardan Petrela. Later, the player is tasked with sabotaging the Albanian Mob's partnership with the Ancelotti family by leading several attacks against the latter while making it look like the Albanians' handiwork.
 A fictional Albanian mafia is the basis for the plot of the film franchise Taken where they abduct women for illegal sex trafficking including the protagonist's daughter.
 One of the main crime bosses in Gangs of London is Luan Dushaj (played by Orli Shuka), the head of the powerful Albanian mafia in London, England and one of the associates of Wallace family (or Wallace Organisation), the main crime syndicate in Gangs of London.
 TV series Besa has its main narrative line placed in the world of Albanian mafia.
 TV series Law & Order: Organized Crime The first 8 episodes of season 2 is an "arc" where Detective Elliot Stabler (Christopher Meloni) goes deep undercover into the New York Albania Mafia.

See also
 Crime in Albania
 Economy of Albania
 Law enforcement in Albania
 Romanian Mafia
 Chinese Triads
 Russian Mafia
 Ukrainian Mafia
 Polish mob
 Sicilian Mafia
 Italian-American Mafia
 Irish Mob
 Jamaican Yardies
 Ismail Lika
 Ethnic Albania Clan
 List of assassinations in Albania
 Alex Rudaj
 Taken (franchise)
 eaViSsi

References

Further reading

External links

 Criminal Families Structures of Albania , Exit.al
 Albanian mafia in New York, CapitalNewYork.com

 
Mafia
Organized crime by ethnic or national origin
Transnational organized crime
Organized crime groups in Albania
Organised crime groups in Australia
European-Australian culture
Organised crime groups in Belgium
Organized crime groups in Canada
Gangs in Toronto
Organized crime groups in China
Organized crime groups in the Czech Republic
Organised crime groups in Denmark
Organised crime groups in England
Organised crime gangs of London
Organized crime groups in Finland
Organized crime groups in France
Organised crime groups in Germany
Organized crime groups in Greece
Organized crime groups in Honduras
Organised crime groups in Ireland
Organised crime groups in Israel
Organised crime groups in Italy
Organized crime groups in Kosovo
Organized crime groups in Montenegro
Organised crime groups in the Netherlands
Organised crime groups in North Macedonia
Organised crime groups in Norway
Organised crime groups in Scotland
Organized crime groups in Serbia
Organized crime groups in Slovakia
Organised crime groups in Spain
Organized crime groups in Sweden
Organized crime groups in Switzerland
Organized crime groups in the United States
Gangs in New York City
Organised crime groups in Wales

sv:Organiserad brottslighet från Balkan#Albanien